The 2020–21 UEFA Europa League knockout phase began on 18 February with the round of 32 and ended on 26 May 2021 with the final at Stadion Miejski in Gdańsk, Poland, to decide the champions of the 2020–21 UEFA Europa League. A total of 32 teams competed in the knockout phase.

Times are CET/CEST, as listed by UEFA (local times, if different, are in parentheses).

Qualified teams
The knockout phase involved 32 teams: the 24 teams which qualified as winners and runners-up of each of the twelve groups in the group stage, and the eight third-placed teams from the Champions League group stage.

Europa League group stage winners and runners-up

Champions League group stage third-placed teams

Format
Each tie in the knockout phase, apart from the final, was played over two legs, with each team playing one leg at home. The team that scored more goals on aggregate over the two legs advanced to the next round. If the aggregate score was level, the away goals rule was applied, i.e. the team that scored more goals away from home over the two legs advanced. If away goals were also equal, then extra time was played. The away goals rule was again applied after extra time, i.e. if there were goals scored during extra time and the aggregate score was still level, the visiting team advanced by virtue of more away goals scored. If no goals were scored during extra time, the winners were decided by a penalty shoot-out. In the final, which was played as a single match, if the score was level at the end of normal time, extra time was played, followed by a penalty shoot-out if the score was still level.

The mechanism of the draws for each round was as follows:
In the draw for the round of 32, the twelve group winners and the four third-placed teams from the Champions League group stage with the better group records were seeded, and the twelve group runners-up and the other four third-placed teams from the Champions League group stage were unseeded. The seeded teams were drawn against the unseeded teams, with the seeded teams hosting the second leg. Teams from the same group or the same association could not be drawn against each other.
In the draws for the round of 16, quarter-finals and semi-finals, there were no seedings, and teams from the same group or the same association could be drawn against each other. As the draws for the quarter-finals and semi-finals were held together before the quarter-finals were played, the identity of the quarter-final winners was not known at the time of the semi-final draw. A draw was also held to determine which semi-final winner was designated as the "home" team for the final (for administrative purposes as it was played at a neutral venue).

In the knockout phase, teams from the same or nearby cities (e.g., Arsenal and Tottenham Hotspur) were not scheduled to play at home on the same day, due to logistics and crowd control. To avoid such scheduling conflict, adjustments had to be made by UEFA. For the round of 32, since both teams were drawn to play at home for the second leg, the home match of the team which were not domestic cup champions in the qualifying season, or the team with the lower domestic ranking (if neither team were the domestic cup champions, e.g. Tottenham Hotspur for this season), was moved from Thursday to Wednesday. For the round of 16, quarter-finals and semi-finals, if the two teams were drawn to play at home for the same leg, the order of legs of the tie involving the team which were not domestic cup champions in the qualifying season, or the team with the lower domestic ranking, was reversed from the original draw.

Schedule
The schedule was as follows (all draws were held at the UEFA headquarters in Nyon, Switzerland).

Bracket

Round of 32

The draw for the round of 32 was held on 14 December 2020, 13:00 CET.

Summary

The first legs were played on 18 February, and the second legs were played on 24 and 25 February 2021.

|}

Matches

Tottenham Hotspur won 8–1 on aggregate.

Dynamo Kyiv won 2–1 on aggregate. 

Manchester United won 4–0 on aggregate.

Arsenal won 4–3 on aggregate.

3–3 on aggregate. Milan won on away goals.

Rangers won 9–5 on aggregate.

Slavia Prague won 2–0 on aggregate.

Villarreal won 4–1 on aggregate.

Roma won 5–1 on aggregate.

Dinamo Zagreb won 4–2 on aggregate.

Young Boys won 6–3 on aggregate.

Molde won 5–3 on aggregate.

Granada won 3–2 on aggregate.

Shakhtar Donetsk won 3–0 on aggregate.

Ajax won 4–2 on aggregate.

Olympiacos won 5–4 on aggregate.

Round of 16

The draw for the round of 16 was held on 26 February 2021, 13:00 CET.

Summary

The first legs were played on 11 March, and the second legs were played on 18 March 2021.

|}
Notes

Matches

Ajax won 5–0 on aggregate.

Villarreal won 4–0 on aggregate.

Roma won 5–1 on aggregate.

Arsenal won 3–2 on aggregate.

Dinamo Zagreb won 3–2 on aggregate.

Manchester United won 2–1 on aggregate.

Slavia Prague won 3–1 on aggregate.

Granada won 3–2 on aggregate.

Quarter-finals

The draw for the quarter-finals was held on 19 March 2021, 13:00 CET.

Summary

The first legs were played on 8 April, and the second legs were played on 15 April 2021.

|}

Matches

Manchester United won 4–0 on aggregate.

Arsenal won 5–1 on aggregate.

Roma won 3–2 on aggregate.

Villarreal won 3–1 on aggregate.

Semi-finals

The draw for the semi-finals was held on 19 March 2021, 13:00 CET, after the quarter-final draw.

Summary

The first legs were played on 29 April, and the second legs were played on 6 May 2021.

|}

Matches

Manchester United won 8–5 on aggregate.

Villarreal won 2–1 on aggregate.

Final

The final was played on 26 May 2021 at the Stadion Miejski in Gdańsk. A draw was held on 19 March 2021, after the quarter-final and semi-final draws, to determine the "home" team for administrative purposes.

Notes

References

External links

3
UEFA Europa League knockout phases
February 2021 sports events in Europe
March 2021 sports events in Europe
April 2021 sports events in Europe
May 2021 sports events in Europe